William Cary may refer to:

William J. Cary (1865–1934), U.S. Representative from Wisconsin
William L. Cary (1910–1983), Chairman of the U.S. Securities and Exchange Commission
 William Dennison Cary (1808–1861), founder and namesake of Cary, Illinois
 William Cary (instrument maker) (1759–1825), English maker of scientific instruments
 William Cary (1437–1471), of Cockington and Clovelly in Devon was a member of the Devonshire gentry. He was beheaded after the defeat of the Lancastrians at the Battle of Tewkesbury in 1471
 W. Sterling Cary (1927–2021), American Christian minister

See also 
William Carey (disambiguation)